Thürk or Thurk  is a German language ethnonymic surname for someone from Turkey. Notable people with the name include:
 Harry Thürk (1927–2005), German writer
 Michael Thurk (1976), German former professional footballer

See also 
 Turk (surname)

References 

German-language surnames
Ethnonymic surnames
Surnames from nicknames